Curcio is a part of the mainland of Colico, Lombardy, northern Italy.

The name Curcio is first mentioned in a slab dated 1585, which can still be seen as a part of the public washing fountain of the town.
The first church was built in 1842 and dedicated to Holy Guardian Angels; a new church was built in 1946-1957.

Sources 
Giovanni Del Tredici, Elena Fattarelli, Colico e il Monte Legnone – Sentieri e Storia, CAI Colico, 2007

See also 
Colico
Villatico
Laghetto
Olgiasca

Frazioni of the Province of Lecco
Colico